José Querubín Moreno Moreno (born December 29, 1959) is a retired Colombian race walker.

Personal best
20 km: 1:20:19 hrs –  New York City, 3 May 1987

Achievements

External links

Sports reference biography

1959 births
Living people
Colombian male racewalkers
Olympic athletes of Colombia
Athletes (track and field) at the 1984 Summer Olympics
Athletes (track and field) at the 1988 Summer Olympics
Athletes (track and field) at the 1983 Pan American Games
Athletes (track and field) at the 1987 Pan American Games
Athletes (track and field) at the 1991 Pan American Games
Athletes (track and field) at the 1995 Pan American Games
Pan American Games medalists in athletics (track and field)
Pan American Games gold medalists for Colombia
Pan American Games bronze medalists for Colombia
South American Games gold medalists for Colombia
South American Games medalists in athletics
Competitors at the 1994 South American Games
Competitors at the 1986 Goodwill Games
Medalists at the 1983 Pan American Games
Medalists at the 1987 Pan American Games
Sportspeople from Boyacá Department
20th-century Colombian people
21st-century Colombian people